Otterøya or Otterøy may refer to:

Places
Otterøya, an island in Namsos municipality in Trøndelag county, Norway
Otterøy, a former municipality in northern Trøndelag county, Norway
Otterøy Church, a church in Namsos municipality in Trøndelag county, Norway
Otterøya (Vestland), an unpopulated island in Bømlo municipality in Vestland county, Norway
Von Otterøya, an island in Hinlopen Strait between Spitsbergen and Nordaustlandet, Svalbard
Otterøya or Otrøya, the largest island in Midsund municipality in Møre og Romsdal county, Norway
Otterøya (Sveio), an island in Sveio municipality in Vestland county, Norway